Mark John Steadman (born 20 May 1974) has been Archdeacon of Stow since 2015.

A former barrister, Steadman was ordained in 2003. After a curacy at St Mary's Church, Portsea he was Priest in charge at St Philip's Church, Avondale Square, Camberwell from 2005 until 2012; Area Dean of Bermondsey from 2008 to 11; and Chaplain to the Bishop of Southwark from 2011 until 2015.

References

1974 births
People educated at St Paul's School, London
Alumni of the University of Southampton
Alumni of Westcott House, Cambridge
20th-century English Anglican priests
Archdeacons of Stow
Living people